The men's 400 metres at the 2016 IAAF World Indoor Championships took place on March 18 and 19, 2016.

All eyes were on Bralon Taplin, who had run the three fastest times of the year, including his win in the semifinals. They included those of the defending champion Pavel Maslák, who followed Taplin closely as he led from the break. For 350 metres it was all Taplin, before Maslák made his move. In three strides, Taplin was beaten. Four metres behind them, Abdalelah Haroun executed an identical move on Deon Lendore.  Taplin was spent and disappeared out the back. Haroun made a big rush at Maslák, but could make up only three of the four meters necessary by the time they crossed the finish line.

Results

Heats
Qualification: First 2 (Q) and next 2 fastest (q) qualified for the semifinals.

Semifinals
Qualification: First 3 (Q) qualified directly for the final.

Final
The final was started on March 19, at 19:05.

References

400 metres
400 metres at the World Athletics Indoor Championships